Cincinnatia is a genus of very small freshwater snails that have an operculum, aquatic gastropod mollusks in the family Hydrobiidae, the mud snails.

Species
The genus Cincinnatia is currently monospecific, containing the single species 'Cincinnatia integra (Say, 1821).

Species brought into synonymy
In 2002, 15 out of the then 16 species of Cincinnatia were transferred to the genera Marstonia and Floridobia:

 Cincinnatia alexander Thompson, 2000: synonym of Floridobia alexander (Thompson, 2000)
 Cincinnatia comalensis (Pilsbry & Ferriss, 1906): synonym of Marstonia comalensis (Pilsbry & Ferriss, 1906)
 Cincinnatia floridana  (Frauenfeld, 1863): synonym of Floridobia floridana (Frauenfeld, 1863)
 Cincinnatia fraterna  Thompson, 1968: synonym of Floridobia fraterna (Thompson, 1968)
 Cincinnatia helicogyra  Thompson, 1968: synonym of Floridobia helicogyra (Thompson, 1968)
 Cincinnatia leptospira  Thompson, 2000: synonym of Floridobia leptospira (Thompson, 2000)
 Cincinnatia mica  Thompson, 1968: synonym of Floridobia mica (Thompson, 1968)
 Cincinnatia monroensis  (Dall, 1885): synonym of Floridobia monroensis (Dall, 1885)
 Cincinnatia parva  Thompson, 1968: synonym of Floridobia parva (Thompson, 1968)
 Cincinnatia petrifons  Thompson, 1968: synonym of Floridobia petrifons (Thompson, 1968)
 Cincinnatia ponderosa  Thompson, 1968: synonym of Floridobia ponderosa (Thompson, 1968)
 Cincinnatia porteri  Thompson, 2000: synonym of Floridobia porteri (Thompson, 2000)
 Cincinnatia vanhyningi  (Vanatta, 1934): synonym of Floridobia vanhyningi (Vanatta, 1934)
 Cincinnatia wekiwae  Thompson, 1968: synonym of Floridobia wekiwae (Thompson, 1968)
 Cincinnatia winkleyi  (Pilsbry, 1912): synonym of Floridobia winkleyi (Pilsbry, 1912)

References

Hydrobiidae
Taxonomy articles created by Polbot